A spiral valve or scroll valve is the corkscrew-shaped lower portion of the intestine of some sharks, Acipenseriformes (sturgeon and paddlefish), rays, skates, bichirs, Lepisosteiformes (gars), and lungfishes. A modification of the ileum, the spiral valve is internally twisted or coiled to increase the surface area of the intestine which increases nutrient absorption.

Description 
The intestines of a shark are much shorter than those of mammals.  Sharks have compensated for this problem by having a spiral valve, or a scroll valve, inside the intestine to increase the absorbent surface of the intestine. By keeping digestible material in the ileum for an extended period maximum nutrient absorption is ensured. For this reason, many sharks and related fish feed very infrequently. The food passes into the comparatively short colon of the shark almost fully digested, and then out the cloaca and vent.

A consequence of the spiral valve constricting the lumen of the ileum is that sharks cannot pass large hard objects (such as bones) through their lower intestine. Such objects instead remain in the stomach until sufficiently broken down for passing through the valve region, or are regurgitated. Consequently, shark stomachs often contain items of interest that enable one to determine what the animals feed on, as well as non-food items ingested during a feeding frenzy.

Sharks also possess a rectal gland that removes excess salt.

See also

 Small intestine
 Physical characteristics of sharks

References

Fish anatomy
Sharks